The Mittelland Canal, also known as the Midland Canal, is a major canal in central Germany. It forms an important link in the waterway network of that country, providing the principal east-west inland waterway connection. Its significance goes beyond Germany as it links France, Switzerland and the Benelux countries with Poland, the Czech Republic and the Baltic Sea.

At  in length, the Mittelland Canal is the longest artificial waterway in Germany.

Route 
The Mittelland Canal branches off the Dortmund-Ems Canal at Hörstel (near Rheine, at ), runs north along the Teutoburg Forest, past Hanover and meets with the Elbe River near Magdeburg. Near Magdeburg it connects to the Elbe-Havel Canal, making a continuous shipping route to Berlin and on to Poland.

At Minden the canal crosses the river Weser over two aqueducts (completed in 1914 and 1998, respectively), and near Magdeburg it crosses the Elbe, also with an aqueduct. Connections by side canals exist at Ibbenbüren, Osnabrück, Minden (two canals connecting to the Weser), Hanover-Linden, Hanover-Misburg, Hildesheim and Salzgitter. West of Wolfsburg, the Elbe Lateral Canal branches off, providing a connection to Hamburg, and (via the Elbe-Lübeck Canal) to the Baltic Sea.

History

Construction of the Mittelland Canal was started in 1906, starting from Bergeshövede (municipality Hörstel) on the Dortmund-Ems Canal. The section to Minden on the Weser was opened in February 1915 and was initially named Ems-Weser-Kanal. The section from Minden to Hanover was finished in the autumn of 1916. The section to Sehnde and the branch canal to Hildesheim were completed in 1928, Peine was reached in 1929, and Braunschweig in 1933. The final section to Magdeburg was opened in 1938, thus creating a direct link between Western and Eastern Germany. The branch canal to Salzgitter was opened in 1941. The planned canal bridge over the Elbe, necessary to avoid low water conditions in summer, was not built due to the Second World War.

After partitioning of Germany following the Second World War, the Mittelland Canal was split between West Germany and East Germany, with the border to the east of Wolfsburg. To provide access from the western section of the canal to Hamburg and Northern Germany, avoiding both East Germany and the Elbe River's sometimes limited navigability, the Elbe Lateral Canal was opened in 1977.

After the reunification of Germany, the importance of the Mittelland Canal as a link from the west to Berlin and the east was reinforced. The project to bridge the Elbe was therefore restarted, and the resulting Magdeburg Water Bridge opened in 2003, providing a direct link to the Elbe-Havel Canal. There are further plans to connect the channel to the Twentekanaal in the Netherlands to shorten the connection towards the Port of Rotterdam.

Towns and cities
 Ibbenbüren
 Osnabrück (via a branch)
 Bramsche
 Lübbecke
 Minden
 Garbsen
 Hannover
 Sehnde
 Hildesheim (via a branch)
 Peine
 Salzgitter (via a branch)
 Braunschweig
 Wolfsburg
 Haldensleben
 Magdeburg

Structures

Minden Aqueduct
Magdeburg Water Bridge

Gallery

References

Canals in Germany
Lübbecke
Preußisch Oldendorf
Wolfsburg
Federal waterways in Germany
Transport in Braunschweig
Transport in Hanover
Canals opened in 1938
CMittelland
CMittelland
CMittelland